The National Corvette Museum showcases the Chevrolet Corvette, an American sports car that has been in production since 1953. It is located in Bowling Green, Kentucky, off Interstate 65's Exit 28. It was constructed in 1994, and opened to the public in September of that year.

The museum is located only a quarter mile from the Bowling Green Assembly Plant, where Corvettes have been made since 1981. Public tours of the assembly plant are unavailable as of June 16, 2017, and GM has given no indication when or if they will resume. Patrons can, through their local Chevrolet dealership, add package option R8C which can give them a VIP tour of the Corvette Museum and assembly plant and patrons can have the option to build their own engine for their Corvette (this option adds $995 (as of 2020) to the car).

2014 skydome collapse
On February 12, 2014, a sinkhole opened under the floor of the Skydome area of the museum at around 5:44 AM local time, causing a portion of the floor to collapse. Kentucky is one of the many states that is notable for having karst topography. Karst topography is the landscape that is formed from the dissolving of rocks such as limestone. In the museum's case, the sinkhole was caused by the dissolving of the limestone in the ground which caused pockets to open underneath the surface. Eventually, the weight of the building caused the top layer of soil to collapse. Eight rare and one-of-a-kind Corvettes, portions of the display stands and rails, large concrete floor slabs and dirt fell into the sinkhole, causing serious damage to some of the Corvettes. The Corvettes involved have an estimated value of a million dollars. The remaining 20 cars in the Skydome were immediately removed from that area. Between March 3, 2014 and March 6, 2014, 5 of the 8 Corvettes were recovered from the sinkhole. The spire area of the Skydome was reinforced before work started on removing the final three buried cars. Multiple multigravity tests were done to ensure that another sinkhole wasn't present or in the making. The results came back clear which allowed for the construction work to begin. For added precaution, micropiles, or systems of steel rods, were inserted into the ground before the concrete was repoured to help give the building more support. The museum reopened the day after the sinkhole appeared.

An exhibit opened in the museum two years later to tell the story of what happened that day and why it happened. This exhibit gives visitors the chance to virtually recover the cars that were in the sinkhole.

Hall of Fame
The museum also sponsors the Corvette Hall of Fame for individuals who have been involved with the Corvette automobile and made significant contributions in their respective fields. Each year, from two to six persons have been inducted into this select group. Members have been divided into three categories: enthusiasts, GM/Chevrolet, and racing.

See also 
 List of sinkholes of the United States
 21st century sinkholes

References

External links 
 
 
 Official Corvette website
 Chubb Corporation, Our Stories: National Corvette Museum - "Flying Cars. Crash Landing."

Museums in Bowling Green, Kentucky
Automobile museums in Kentucky
Chevrolet Corvette
501(c)(3) organizations
Non-profit organizations based in Kentucky
Museums established in 1994
1994 establishments in Kentucky
Halls of fame in Kentucky